Forces of Nature is a four-part television documentary series presented by physicist Brian Cox. The series was co-produced by BBC Studios, PBS and France Télévisions and originally aired in the United Kingdom weekly from 4 July 2016 at 21:00 on BBC One.

The documentary series couples high-definition cinematography with calm and methodical narration, uncovering how some of our planet's most beautiful sights and events are created by the underlying forces of nature. It follows on from Brian's 2014 series for the BBC, Human Universe. An accompanying book with the same name has also been published.

The US version does not feature Brian Cox.

Episodes

See also
Wonders of the Solar System
Wonders of the Universe
Wonders of Life
Human Universe

References

External links

Forces of Nature at PBS
Forces of Nature at Australian Broadcasting Corporation

2016 British television series debuts
2016 British television series endings
BBC television documentaries
English-language television shows
BBC television documentaries about science
Astronomy in the United Kingdom
Documentary television series about astronomy
Television series by BBC Studios